Second Five-Year Plan may refer to:

Second five-year plan of Argentina
 Second Five-Year Plan (Bhutan)
 Second Five-Year Plan (China)
 Second Five-Year Plan (India)
 Second Five-Year Plan (Nepal)
 Second Five-Year Plans (Pakistan)
 Second Five-Year Plan (Romania)
 Second Five-Year Plan (South Korea)
 Second Five-Year Plan (Soviet Union)
 Second Five-Pear Plan (Vietnam)

See also
Five-year plan
Third Five-Year Plan (disambiguation)